Flamur Dzelili (born 9 September 1999) is a Swedish professional footballer who plays as a winger for Superettan club Jönköpings Södra IF.

Club career

Varbergs BoIS
On 10 December 2021, Dzelili signed a two-year precontract with Allsvenskan club Varbergs BoIS and this transfer would become legally effective in January 2022. On 19 February 2022, he was named as a Varbergs BoIS substitute for the first time in the 2021–22 Svenska Cupen group stage against Sollentuna FK. His debut with Varbergs BoIS came on 2 October 2022 in a 1–1 home draw against BK Häcken after coming on as a substitute at last minutes in place of André Boman.

Jönköpings Södra IF
On 19 January 2023, Dzelili signed a two-year contract with Superettan club Jönköpings Södra IF. His debut with Jönköpings Södra IF came a month later in the 2022–23 Svenska Cupen group stage against BK Häcken after coming on as a substitute at 65th minute in place of Taylor Silverholt. Seven days after debut, Dzelili scored his first goal for Jönköpings Södra IF in his second appearance for the club in a 1–3 away defeat over Halmstads BK in 2022–23 Svenska Cupen group stage.

References

External links

1999 births
Living people
Swedish men's footballers
Swedish people of Kosovan descent
Swedish people of Albanian descent
Kosovan men's footballers
Association football wingers
Division 3 (Swedish football) players
Ettan Fotboll players
Oskarshamns AIK players
Allsvenskan players
Varbergs BoIS players